Gregorio  Bausá (1590–1656) was a Spanish painter of the Baroque period.

Born in the island of Majorca in the village of Sóller to Juan Bausá, he was baptized on August 23 the same year. He was a nephew of Simón Bausá Sales who became bishop of Majorca in 1607. He was the pupil of Francisco Ribalta, and painted devotional paintings. He died in Valencia.

References

Antonio Palomino, An account of the lives and works of the most eminent Spanish painters, sculptors and architects, 1724, first English translation, 1739, p. 40

1590 births
1656 deaths
Spanish Baroque painters
People from Sóller
Painters from the Balearic Islands